Ragnvald Knaphövde was a King of Sweden whose reign is estimated to have occurred in the mid-1120s or c. 1130. His cognomen Knaphövde is explained as referring to a drinking vessel, the size of a man's head or meaning "round head" and referring to his being foolish. Ragnvald is mentioned in the regnal list of the Westrogothic law as the successor of King Inge the Younger.

His parentage is uncertain: King Inge the Elder of Sweden had a son named Ragnvald, and historian Sven Tunberg has suggested him as identical with Ragnvald Knaphövde. However, another tradition presents King Ragnvald as the son of an Olof Näskonung (Neskonungr meant "king of a ness" or "petty king", in Old Norse), and the regnal list of the Westrogothic law does not mention that Ragnvald had any connection with the old line of kings.

Election and assassination
Ragnvald Knaphövde had been elected king by the Swedes in Uppland and then acknowledged by the East Gothlanders in Östergötland on his Eriksgata, but when he entered Västergötland, he did so without taking Geatish hostages. In Karleby near Falköping, he was murdered by the Geats who instead had elected the Danish prince Magnus Nielsen who became King Magnus I of Sweden.

The Danish chronicler Saxo Grammaticus explained later in the same century that the election of Magnus and the murder of a rightful king of Sweden was part of a Gothic (Geatish) plan to arrogate the right of electing the king from the Swedes:

In the following century, in the Westrogothic law, the Geats would acknowledge that it was the Swedes who were entitled to elect and depose the king. In the regnal list of this law, they ignored the existence of any Magnus, but instead they defended the murder of Ragnvald as follows:

Thus, the Geats explained the murder of Ragnvald as vengeance for his arrogant attitude towards them. After the death of King Magnus, the West Gothland region was ruled by jarls, probably under the nominal supremacy of Danish kings during a few decades until the Swedish king Sverker the Elder and after him the Swedish king Erik Jedvardsson were accepted there. 
 
The 16th-century Swedish King John III would later have a damaged tombstone replaced for Ragnvald, over a grave at Vreta Abbey. This is considered the family grave of King Inge the Elder, named for that king's son mentioned above.

External links

Notes and references

12th-century Swedish monarchs
12th-century murdered monarchs
Year of birth unknown
Year of death unknown